St. Clair Township is located in St. Clair County, Illinois. As of the 2010 census, its population was 35,498 and it contained 15,366 housing units. St. Clair Township formed from a portion of Belleville Township on October 5, 1885.

Geography

Demographics

Notable people
 Jason Boyd, MLB pitcher for the Pittsburgh Pirates, Philadelphia Phillies, San Diego Padres and Cleveland Indians

References

External links
St. Clair Township Official Site
City-data.com
St. Clair County Official Site
Illinois State Archives

Townships in St. Clair County, Illinois
Townships in Illinois